Mashiran (also Romanized as Mashīrān and Moshīrān) is a village in Yaft Rural District of Moradlu District, Meshgin Shahr County, Ardabil province, Iran. At the 2006 census, its population was 929 in 199 households. The following census in 2011 counted 804 people in 209 households. The latest census in 2016 showed a population of 815 people in 235 households; it was the largest village in its rural district.

References 

Meshgin Shahr County

Towns and villages in Meshgin Shahr County

Populated places in Ardabil Province

Populated places in Meshgin Shahr County